The 35th Filipino Academy of Movie Arts and Sciences Awards Night was held on May 6, 1988 at the Manila Hotel Fiesta Pavilion in the Philippines, honoring the best films of 1987.

Saan Nagtatago ang Pag-ibig won the most awards with four wins including the most coveted FAMAS Award for Best Picture Three people were elevated to the "Hall Of Fame" status after winning their respective categories five times. They were Fernando Poe Jr. for best actor, Augusto Salvador for editing and George Canseco for musical score. This is the second time for Canseco who was earlier inducted to the Hall of Fame for winning five time in the Theme Song Category.

Awards

Major awards
Winners are listed first and highlighted with boldface.

{| class=wikitable
|-
! style="background:#EEDD82; width:50%" | Best Picture
! style="background:#EEDD82; width:50%" | Best Director
|-
| valign="top" |
 Saan Nagtatago ang Pag-ibig — Viva FilmsBalweg — Viva Films
Paano kung Wala Ka Na? — Regal Films
Pinulot Ka Lang sa Lupa — Regal Films
Tagos sa Dugo — V.H. Films
| valign="top" |
 Eddie Garcia — Saan Nagtatago ang Pag-ibig
Leroy Salvador — Alabok sa Lupa 
Mel Chionglo — Paano Kung Wala Ka Na 
Ishmael Bernal —  Pinulot Ka Lang sa Lupa 
Maryo J. De los Reyes — Tagos sa Dugo 
|-
! style="background:#EEDD82; width:50%" | Best Actor
! style="background:#EEDD82; width:50%" | Best Actress
|-
| valign="top" |
 Rudy Fernandez — Operation: Get Victor Corpus, the Rebel Soldier
Phillip Salvador — Balweg
Christopher De Leon — Maging Akin Ka Lamang 
Dolphy — Once Upon a Time 
Tonton Gutierrez — Saan Nagtatago ang Pag-ibig? 
| valign="top" |
 Vilma Santos — Tagos ng Dugo
Lorna Tolentino — Maging Akin Ka Lamang
Susan Roces — Paano Kung Wala Ka Na 
Sharon Cuneta — Pasan Ko ang Daigdig 
Maricel Soriano — Pinulot Ka Lang sa Lupa 
|-
! style="background:#EEDD82; width:50%" | Best Supporting Actor
! style="background:#EEDD82; width:50%" | Best Supporting Actress
|-
| valign="top" |
 Jay Ilagan — Maging Akin Ka Lamang
Johnny Delgado — Balweg
Mark Gil — Kid, Huwag Kang Susuko 
Ricky Davao — Kung Aagawin Mo ang Lahat sa Akin 
Ronnie Ricketts — Target: Sparrow Unit 
| valign="top" |
 Nida Blanca — Kid, Huwag Kang Susuko
Jackie Lou Blanco — Kung Aagawin Mo ang Lahat sa Akin 
Dina Bonnevie — Maging Akin Ka Lamang
Snooky Serna — Paano Kung Wala Ka Na 
 Gloria Romero   — Saan Nagtatago ang Pag-ibig 
|-
! style="background:#EEDD82; width:50%" | Best Child Actor
! style="background:#EEDD82; width:50%" | Best Child Actress
|-
| valign="top" |
 Mel Martinez — Kid, Huwag Kang Susuko
 Joko Diaz — Ibigay Mo sa Akin ang Bukas 
 Chuckie Dreyfus — Once Upon a Time Raymond and Richard Gutierrez — Takbo...! Bilis...! Takboooo
 Ian de Leon — Takot Ako, Eh! 
 Vandolph — Wanted: Bata Batuta! 
| valign="top" |
 Glaiza Herradura — Batas sa Aking kamay 
 Rose Ann Gonzales — Mga Anak ni Facifica Falayfay 
 Matet de Leon — Bunsong Kerubin
 Tina Cruz — Vigilante
 Katrin Gonzales — Walang Karugtong ang Nakaraan 
|-
! style="background:#EEDD82; width:50%" | Best in Screenplay
! style="background:#EEDD82; width:50%" | Best Story
|-
| valign="top" |
 Alfred Yuson — Kid, Huwag Kang Susuko| valign="top" |
 Gilda Olvidado — Saan Nagtatago ang Pag-ibig?|-
! style="background:#EEDD82; width:50%" | Best Sound 
! style="background:#EEDD82; width:50%" | Best Musical Score
|-
| valign="top" |
  Rolly Ruta — Saan Nagtatago ang Pag-ibig 
| valign="top" |
  Willy Cruz — Balweg 
|-
! style="background:#EEDD82; width:50%" | Best Cinematography 
! style="background:#EEDD82; width:50%" | Best Editing
|-
| valign="top" |
 Romy Vitug — Saan Nagtatago ang Pag-ibig 
| valign="top" |
 Ike Jarlego Jr. — Balweg 
|-
! style="background:#EEDD82; width:50%" | Best Theme Song
! style="background:#EEDD82; width:50%" | Production Design
|-
| valign="top" |
 Gines Tan — Pinulot Ka Lang sa Lupa| valign="top" |
 Don Escudero — Once Upon a Time 
|-
|}

Special AwardeeHall of Fame AwardeeFernando Poe Jr. - Actor1986 - Muslim .357
1984 - Umpisahan Mo, Tatapusin Ko
1980 - Durugin si Totoy Bato
1972 - Asedillo
1968 - Mga Alabok sa LupaHall of Fame AwardeeAugusto Salvador - Editing1987 - Lumuhod Ka sa Lupa
1986 - Partida
1980 - Durugin si Totoy Bato
1979 - Gumising Ka, Maruja
1971 - Mga Anghel Na Walang LangitHall of Fame AwardeeGeorge Canseco - Musical Score'''
1987 - Palimos ng Pag-ibig1983 - Gaano Kadalas ang Minsan?1981 - Miss X1980 - Huwag, Bayaw1979 - Pagputi ng Uwak, Pag-itim ng Tagak''

References

External links
FAMAS Awards 

FAMAS Award
FAMAS
FAMAS